is a Japanese voice actor and singer affiliated with 81 Produce and Sacra Music.

Biography

Early life

Saito was born on April 22, 1991, in Shōwa, Yamanashi Prefecture, Japan. He is the eldest of three siblings, with two younger sisters. He started wanting to become a voice actor in high school, inspired by Akira Ishida's role as Koyemshi in Bokurano. Prior to that, he wanted to become a musician or a novel writer.

Voice acting career
Saito joined the second 81 Produce’s Audition in 2008. In that audition, a total of 1,035 people participated with only 33 going to the final audition to decide who would win and stay training under the talent agency. He won the audition for the male category and started taking voice acting classes at 81 ACTOR'S STUDIO afterwards, while still attending high school.

In 2009, Saito won the "Judges' Special Prize" in the recitation competition at the 33rd . Veteran voice actor Nobuyo Ōyama was one of the judges present at that time.

He started his career as a voice actor in 2010, voicing minor roles in a few anime and video games. He put less focus on his career as a voice actor during his first two years to focus himself on his studies at Waseda University. After graduating from college in 2014, he started to take on more important roles. The first major role that he got through audition was Tasuku Ryuenji in the anime series Future Card Buddyfight. In the same year, Saito got other major roles as Tadashi Yamaguchi in the anime series Haikyu!!, Tatsumi in the anime series Akame ga Kill!, and Twelve in the anime series Terror in Resonance.

At the 9th Seiyu Awards in 2015, Saito won the "Best Male Newcomer" award for his role as Twelve in the anime series Terror in Resonance. He shared the award with Ryōta Ōsaka and Natsuki Hanae. In March 2019, he and the other members of Hypnosis Mic received a singing award in the 13th Voice Actor Awards.

Music career
Saito made his debut as a solo artist in 2017, under Sacra Music. 
He released his first single  on June 7, 2017.

His second single  was released on September 6, 2017. The song  was used as the opening theme song to Katsugeki/Touken Ranbu.

Saito released his third single  on June 20, 2018. For his third single, he took upon himself songwriting duties, writing lyrics and music for all songs featured on it.

Saitō released his first album, quantum stranger, on December 19, 2018. On February 24, 2019, Saito held his 1st solo live concert entitled "Saito Soma 1st LIVE quantum stranger(s)" in Maihama Amphitheater. A blu-ray edition of the concert was released on June 5 of the same year the concert was held.

Personal life
On January 24, 2022, Saito tested positive for COVID-19.

Filmography

TV anime

Original video animation (OVA)

Original net animation (ONA)

Animated films

Video games

Drama CD

Boys love CDs

Stage

TV Show

Dubbing roles

Discography

Singles

EPs

Digital Albums

Studio Albums

Character song

Concerts

Personal Concerts

Other concerts

Awards

References

External links
  
  
 

1991 births
Living people
Japanese male pop singers
Japanese male video game actors
Japanese male voice actors
Musicians from Yamanashi Prefecture
Sacra Music artists
Voice actors from Yamanashi Prefecture
Waseda University alumni
21st-century Japanese male actors
21st-century Japanese singers
21st-century Japanese male singers
81 Produce voice actors